Cape George is an unincorporated community on the Olympic Peninsula in Washington state. It lies along the eastern shore of Discovery Bay on the western coast of the Quimper Peninsula in eastern Jefferson County.

Unincorporated communities in Washington (state)
Unincorporated communities in Jefferson County, Washington